Belpahar railway station is a railway station on the South East Central Railway network in the state of Odisha, India. It serves Belpahar town. Its code is BPH. It has two platforms. Passenger, Express and Superfast trains halt at Belpahar railway station.

Trains

 Shalimar–Lokmanya Tilak Terminus Express
 Kalinga Utkal Express
 Lokmanya Tilak Terminus–Bhubaneswar Superfast Express
 Jharsuguda - Gondia MEMU Speciaal
 Titlagarh-Bilaspur Passenger Speciaal

See also
 Jharsuguda district

References

Railway stations in Jharsuguda district
Bilaspur railway division